This is a list of fishes recorded from the oceans bordering South Africa.
This list comprises locally used common names, scientific names with author citation and recorded ranges. Ranges specified may not be the entire known range for the species, but should include the known range within the waters surrounding the Republic of South Africa.

List ordering and taxonomy complies where possible with the current usage in Wikispecies, and may differ from the cited source, as listed citations are primarily for range or existence of records for the region.
Sub-taxa within any given taxon are arranged alphabetically as a general rule.
Details of each species may be available through the relevant internal links. Synonyms may be listed where useful.

Superclass Agnatha – Jawless fishes (Cyclostomes)

Class Myxini

Order Myxiniformes – Hagfishes
Family: Myxinidae
Six-gill hagfish or snotslang Eptatretus hexatrema (Müller, 1834) (Walvis Bay to Durban)
Eightgill hagfish Eptatretus octatrema Barnard, 1923 (Agulhas bank)
Fivegill hagfish Eptatretus profundus Barnard, 1923 (off Cape Point)
Cape hagfish Myxine capensis Regan, 1913 (Cape of Good Hope)

Superclass Gnathostomata – Jawed fishes

Class Chondrichthyes – Cartilaginous fishes

Subclass Elasmobranchii – Sharks and Rays

Superorder Rajomorphii – Rays (including skates, guitarfish and sawfish)

Order Myliobatiformes – Stingrays
Superfamily: Myliobatoidea 
Family: Gymnuridae
Japanese butterflyray Gymnura japonica (Temminck and Schlegel, 1850) (Agulhas bank) (Identification provisional)
Backwater butterflyray Gymnura natalensis (Gilchrist and Thompson, 1911) (Mossel Bay to southern Mozambique)
Family: Myliobatidae – Eagle rays 

Spotted eagle ray Aetobatus narinari (Euphrasen, 1790) (Mossel Bay to Mozambique)
Manta Manta birostris (Donndorff, 1798) (possibly circumtropical, from the Cape eastwards)
Longhorned mobula Mobula eregoodootenkee (Cuvier, 1829) (Indo-West Pacific south to Natal)
Spinetail mobula Mobula japanica (Müller & Henle, 1841) (Natal)
Devilray Mobula kuhlii (Valenciennes, 1841) (Port Alfred to Indo-West Pacific)
Spiny mobula Mobula tarapacana (Lloyd, 1908) (Reported from Natal and Jeffrey's Bay)
Smoothtail mobula Mobula thurstoni (Lloyd, 1908) (Reported from Natal and Algoa Bay)
Eagle ray Myliobatis aquila (Linnaeus, 1758) (Namibia to KwaZulu-Natal)
Bullray Pteromylaeus bovinus (Saint-Hilaire, 1817) (South-western Cape to Zanzibar)
Flapnose ray Rhinoptera javanica Muller and Henle, 1841 (Durban and north)

Family: Hexatrygonidae – Sixgill stingrays
Sixgill stingray Hexatrygon bickelli Heemstra and Smith, 1980 (Port Elizabeth and Port Alfred)

Order Pristiformes – Sawfishes
Family: Pristidae – Sawfishes
Largetooth sawfish Pristis microdon Latham, 1794 (Natal to tropical Indo-West Pacific)
Smalltooth sawfish Pristis pectinata Latham, 1794 (Port Alfred to Mozambique)
Longcomb sawfish Pristis zijsron Bleeker, 1851 (Port Alfred to Indo-West Pacific)

Order Rajiformes – Rays, skates and guitarfish
Superfamily: Dasyatoidea

Family: Dasyatidae – Stingrays
Short tailed stingray Dasyatis brevicaudata (Hutton, 1875) (False Bay to Delagoa Bay)
Blue stingray Dasyatis chrysonota (Smith, 1828) (Central Angola to Delagoa Bay) (syn. Dasyatis marmoratis)
Thorntail stingray Dasyatis thetidis Ogilby, 1899 (Algoa Bay to Mozambique)
Pelagic stingray Dasyatis violacea (Bonaparte, 1832) (offshore, two records from SA)
Dragon stingray Himantura draco Compagno and Heemstra, 1984 (off Durban)
Sharpnose stingray Himantura gerrardi (Gray, 1851) (Eastern Cape to Mozambique)
Honeycomb stingray Himantura uarnak (Forsskål, 1775) (Port Alfred to Mozambique)
Roundnose stingray Himantura sp. (Durban bay)
Bluespotted stingray Neotrygon kuhlii (Müller & Henle, 1841) (Durban to tropical Indo-West Pacific)(Syn. Dasyatis kuhlii)
Feathertail stingray Pastinachus sephen (Forsskål, 1775) (Zululand) (syn. Hypolophus sephen, Dasyatis sephen)
Bluespotted ribbontail ray Taeniura lymma (Forsskål, 1775)
Round ribbontail ray or Giant reef rayTaeniura meyeni Müller & Henle, 1841 (Natal to Red Sea) (syn. Taeniura melanospilos Bleeker, 1853)
Porcupineray Urogymnus asperrimus (Bloch and Schneider, 1801) (Natal to Indo-West Pacific)

Superfamily: Rajoidea – Skates

Family: Rajidae – Skates
Anacanthobatis marmoratus von Bonde and Swart, 1923 (Durban to southern Mozambique)
Bathyraja smithii (Müller & Henle, 1841) (Agulhas bank and west of Cape Town)
Cruriraja durbanensis (von Bonde and Swart, 1923) (off Western Cape province)
Cruriraja parcomaculata von Bonde and Swart, 1923 (Lüderitz to Durban)
Cruriraja triangularis Smith, 1964 (Durban to Mozambique)
Neoraja stehmanni (Hulley, 1972) (West of Cape Town to south of Agulha Bank)
Raja caudaspinosa von Bonde and Swart, 1923 (Luderitz to Cape Point)
Thornback skate Raja clavata Linnaeus, 1758 (Walvis Bay to Durban)
Raja confundens Hulley, 1970 (West coast from 19°S to east of Cape Point)
Raja dissimilis Hulley, 1970 (west of Cape Town)
Raja leopardus von Bonde and Swart, 1923 (west coast from 18°S to 35°S)
Twineye skate Raja miraletus Linnaeus, 1758 (False Bay to Durban)
Raja pullopunctata Smith, 1964 (Luderitz to Mozambique)
Raja ravidula Hulley, 1970 (off Cape Town)
Raja robertsi Hulley, 1970 (west of Cape Town)
Raja spinacidermis Barnard, 1923 (off west coast)
Raja springeri Wallace, 1967 (Durban to Mozambique)
Biscuit skate or False thornback skate Raja straelini (West Africa to East London)
Blancmange skate Raja Wallacei Hulley, 1970 (Cape to Limpopo river mouth)
Spearnose skate Rostroraja alba (Lacepède, 1803) (West Africa to Madagascar) (syn. Raja alba)

Superfamily: Rhinobatoidea – Guitarfish (Sandsharks)

Family: Rhinobatidae – Guitarfish
Bowmouth guitarfish Rhina ancylostoma Bloch & Schneider, 1801 (KwaZulu-Natal to tropical Ind-West Pacific)
Lesser sandshark or Lesser guitarfish Rhinobatos annulatus Smith in Müller & Henle, 1841 (Cape Columbine to Mozambique)
Bluntnose guitarfish Rhinobatos blochii Müller & Henle, 1841 (Cape to Walvis Bay)
Slender guitarfish Rhinobatos holcorhynchus Norman, 1922 (Port Shepstone to Zululand)
Greyspot guitarfish Rhinobatos leucospilus Norman, 1926 (Durban to Amatikulu Bluff)
Speckled guitarfish Rhinobatos ocellatus Norman, 1926 (Algoa Bay)
Giant sandshark Rhynchobatus djiddensis (Forsskål, 1775) (Knysna to Mozambique)

Order Torpediniformes – Electric rays

Family: Narkidae
Ornate torpedo ray Electrolux addisoni Compagno & Heemstra, 2007 (Coffee Bay, Eastern Cape Province, to just north of Durban, kwaZulu-Natal)
Natal electric ray Heteronarce garmani Regan, 1921 (Algoa Bay to KwaZulu-Natal)
Onefin electric ray or Torpedo ray Narke capensis (Gmelin, 1789) (Atlantic coast of Cape Peninsula to Madagascar)
Family: Torpedinidae
Blackspotted electric ray Torpedo fuscomaculata Peters, 1855 (Cape Columbine to Mozambique)
Atlantic electric ray Torpedo nobiliana Bonaparte, 1835 (Western Cape coast to Algoa Bay)
Marbled electrical ray Torpedo sinuspersici Olfers, 1831 (Eastern Cape to Mozambique)

Superorder Selachimorpha – Sharks

Order Carcharhiniformes – Ground sharks
Family: Carcharhinidae – Requiem sharks
Silvertip shark Carcharhinus albimarginatus (Rüppell, 1837) (North of Cape Vidal)
Bignose shark Carcharhinus altimus (Springer, 1950) (Eastern Cape and KwaZulu-Natal)
Shortnose blacktail reef shark or Grey reef shark Carcharhinus amblyrhynchos (Bleeker, 1856) (Northern KwaZulu-Natal to Red Sea)(Syn. Carcharhinus wheeleri (Garrick, 1982))
Java shark Carcharhinus amboinensis (Müller and Henle, 1839) (Eastern Cape and Natal)
Copper shark Carcharhinus brachyurus (Günther, 1870) (Namibia to Durban)
Spinner shark Carcharhinus brevipinna (Müller and Henle, 1838) (Mossel Bay to Red sea)
Silky shark Carcharhinus falciformis (Bibron, 1839) (Durban to Zanzibar)
Zambezi or Bull shark Carcharhinus leucas (Valenciennes in Müller & Henle, 1839) (Port Elizabeth to Mozambique)
Blacktip shark Carcharhinus limbatus (Müller and Henle, 1839) (Southern Cape to Madagascar)
Oceanic whitetip shark Carcharhinus longimanus (Poey, 1861) (South-eastern Cape and Natal)
Dusky shark Carcharhinus obscurus (Lesueur, 1818) (Cape Point to Mozambique)
Sandbar shark Carcharhinus plumbeus (Nardo, 1827) (Algoa Bay to Madagascar)
Blackspot shark Carcharhinus sealei (Pietschmann, 1913) (Natal to Zanzibar)
Spot-tail shark Carcharhinus sorrah (Valenciennes, 1839) (Northern Natal to Red Sea)
Tiger shark Galeocerdo cuvier (Péron & Lesueur, 1822) (Port Elizabeth to Mozambique)
Sliteye shark Loxodon macrorhinus (Müller and Henle, 1839) (Natal to Tropical Indo-West Pacific)
Lemon shark Negaprion acutidens (Rüppell, 1837) (Natal and Indo-Pacific)
Blue shark Prionace glauca (Linnaeus, 1758) (off south-western Cape coast)
Milk shark Rhizoprionodon acutus (Rüppell, 1837) (Southern KwaZulu-Natal to Indo-West Pacific)
Whitetip reef shark Triaenodon obesus (Rüppell, 1837) (Southern KwaZulu-Natal to Mozambique)
Family: Hemigaleidae
Snaggletooth Hemipristis elongata (Klunzinger, 1871) (Natal and Indo-West Pacific)
Whitetip weasel shark Paragaleus leucolomatus Compagno and Smale, 1985 (Kosi Bay)

Family: Proscylliidae
Eridacnis sinuans (Smith, 1927) (Natal to Tanzania)

Family: Scyliorhinidae – Catsharks
Apristurus microps (Gilchrist, 1922) (Western Cape to Agulhas)
Apristurus saldanha (Barnard 1925) (Saldanha bay)
Swell shark Cephaloscyllium sufflans (Regan, 1921) (Central KwaZulu-Natal to Gulf of Aden)
Lined catshark or Banded catshark Halaelurus lineatus Bass, D'Aubrey & Kistnasamy, 1975 (KwaZulu-Natal to Mozambique)
Tiger catshark Halaelurus natalensis (Regan, 1904)
Puffadder shyshark or Happy Eddie Haploblepharus edwardsii (Schinz, 1822) (Cape Point to central KwaZulu-Natal)
Brown shyshark Haploblepharus fuscus Smith, 1950 (Cape Agulhas to southern KwaZulu-Natal)
Dark shyshark, Dusky shyshark or Skaamoog Haploblepharus pictus (Müller & Henle, 1838) (Namibia to Cape Agulhas)
Spotted catshark Holohalaelurus punctatus (Gilchrist, 1914) (Natal to Mozambique)
Holohalaelurus regani (Gilchrist, 1922) (South-western Cape to Zanzibar)
Pyjama catshark or Striped catshark Poroderma africanum (Gmelin, 1789) (Cape Columbine to central KwaZulu-Natal)
Blackspotted catshark Poroderma marleyi Fowler, 1933 (Port St. Johns to Natal)
Leopard catshark Poroderma pantherinum (Müller & Henle, 1838) (Cape Columbine to Durban)
Yellowspotted catshark Scylliorhinus capensis (Smith, 1838) (South-western Cape to KwaZulu-Natal)

Family: Sphyrnidae – Hammerhead sharks
Scalloped hammerhead shark Sphyrna lewini (Griffith & Smith, 1834) (East London to Mozambique)
Great hammerhead Sphyrna mokarran (Rüppell, 1837) (Natal to tropical Indo-Pacific)
Smooth hammerheadSphyrna zygaena (Linnaeus, 1758) (South Cape to southern Mozambique, occasionally on west coast. Warm temperate waters of both hemispheres)

Family: Triakidae – Houndsharks
Soupfin shark Galeorhinus galeus (Linnaeus, 1758) (Angola to East London)
Lesser soupfin shark Hypogaleus hyugaensis (Miyosi, 1939) (Natal to Zanzibar)
Hardnosed smooth-hound Mustelus mosis Hemprich and Ehrenberg, 1899 (Durban to Red Sea)
Smooth-hound shark Mustelus mustelus (Linnaeus, 1758) (Namibia to KwaZulu-Natal)
Whitespotted smooth-hound Mustelus palumbes Smith, 1957 (Walvis bay to Algoa bay)
Flapnose houndshark Scylliogaleus quecketti Boulenger, 1902 (north-eastern Cape to Natal)
Spotted gully shark Triakis megalopterus (Smith, 1839) (Walvis Bay to East London)

Order Hexanchiformes – Cow and frill sharks

Family: Hexanchidae – Cow sharks
Sharpnose sevengill shark Heptranchias perlo Bonnaterre, 1788 (KwaZulu-Natal)
Sixgill shark Hexanchus griseus (Bonnaterre, 1788) (All oceans)
Bigeye sixgill shark Hexanchus vitulus Springer and Waller, 1969 (Atlantic, south-west Indian Ocean)
Spotted sevengill cowshark or Broadnose sevengill shark Notorynchus cepedianus (Péron, 1807) (Namibia to East London)

Order Lamniformes – Mackerel sharks
Family: Alopiidae – Thresher sharks
Smalltooth thresher Alopias pelagicus Nakamura, 1935 (Durban to northwest Indian Ocean)
Bigeye thresher Alopias superciliosus (Lowe, 1840) (Eastern Cape and Natal, Warm oceanic waters)
Thintail thresher Alopias vulpinus (Bonnaterre, 1788) (throughout SA waters, more common in southern part)
Family: Cetorhinidae – Basking sharks
Basking shark Cetorhinus maximus (Gunnerus, 1765) (Temperate waters of all oceans, a few records from south-western Cape)
Family: Lamnidae – Mackerel sharks
Great white shark Carcharodon carcharias (Linnaeus, 1758) (Namibia to Mozambique)
Shortfin makoIsurus oxyrinchus Rafinesque, 1810 (Warm temperate and tropical waters of all oceans)
Porbeagle Lamna nasus (Bonnaterre, 1788) (Temperate oceans, recorded from False Bay and possibly Knysna)

Family: Mitsukurinidae – Goblin sharks
Goblin shark Mitsukurina owstoni Jordan, 1898 (west of Cape Town and off Transkei coast)
Family: Odontaspididae
Ragged-tooth shark or Spotted ragged-tooth shark Carcharias taurus Rafinesque, 1810 (Cape Point to Mozambique) (syn. Eugomphodus taurus)
Bumpytail ragged-tooth shark Odontaspis ferox (Risso, 1810) (Natal)
Family: Pseudocarchariidae – Crocodile sharks
Crocodile shark Pseudocarcharias kamoharai (Matsubara, 1936) (once found near Cape Town)

Order Orectolobiformes – Carpet sharks

Family: Ginglymostomatidae
Giant sleepy shark Nebrius concolor Ruppell, 1837 (Natal to Indo-West Pacific)

Family: Rhincodontidae – Whale sharks
Whale shark Rhincodon typus Smith, 1828 (Northern Natal)
Family: Stegostomatidae
Zebra shark Stegostoma fasciatum (Hermann, 1783) (KwaZulu-Natal to Mozambique)

Order Pristiophoriformes – Sawsharks
Family: Pristiophoridae
Sixgill sawshark Pliotrema warreni Regan, 1906 (False Bay to southern Mozambique)

Order Squaliformes – Dogfish sharks

Family: Echinorhinidae – Bramble sharks
Bramble shark Echinorhinus brucus (Bonnaterre, 1788) (Namibia to southern KwaZulu-Natal)
Family: Squalidae – Dogfishes
Centrophorus granulosus (Bloch and Schneider, 1801) (Western Cape)
Centrophorus lusitanicus Bocage and Capello, 1864 (Natal)
Centrophorus scalpratus McCulloch, 1915 (Natal to southern Mozambique)
Centrophorus squamosis Bonnaterre, 1788 (Western Cape and Algoa Bay)
Centroscyllium fabricii (Reinhardt, 1825) (Western Cape)
Centroscymnus crepidater (Bocage and Capello, 1864) (Western Cape)
Centroscymnus obscurus Vaillant, 1888 (off Durban)
Deania calcea (Lowe, 1839) (Cape Point and Algoa Bay)
Deania profundorum (Smith and Radcliffe, 1912) (West coast and Natal)
Deania quadrispinosus (McCulloch, 1915) (Northern Namibia to Southern Mozambique)
Etmopterus brachurus Smith and Radcliffe, 1912 (Western Cape, Natal and southern Mozambique)
Etmopterus granulosus (Günther, 1880) (Cape Point)
Etmopterus lucifer Jordan and Snyder, 1902 (off Natal)
Etmopterus pusillus (Lowe, 1839) (off Natal)
Etmoptosus sentosus Bass, D'Aubrey and Kistnasamy, 1973 (off Natal)
Etmopterus sp. (off south-western Cape Province, northern KwaZulu-Natal)
Euprotomicroides zantedeschia Hulley and Penrith, 1966 (West of Cape Town)
Euprotomicrus bispinatus (Quoy and Gaimard, 1824) (all oceans)
Heteroscymnoides marleyi Fowler, 1934 (Durban)
Flatiron shark Oxynotus centrina (Linnaeus, 1758) (Walvis Bay to Cape Town)
Seal shark Scymnorhinus licha (Bonnaterre, 1788) (Algoa bay to Mozambique)
Greenland shark Somniosus microcephalus (Schneider, 1801) (off Cape Columbine)
Spotted spiny dogfish Squalus acanthias Linnaeus, 1758 (South-western Cape to Port Elizabeth)
Roughskin spiny dogfish Squalus asper Merrett, 1973 (Natal to north of Madagascar)
Bluntnose spiny dogfish Squalus megalops (MacLeay, 1882) (Namibia to southern Mozambique)
Longnose spiny dogfish Squalus mitsukurii Jordan and Fowler, 1903 (Orange river to Beira)

Order Squatiniformes – Angelsharks
Family: Squatinidae
African angelshark Squatina africana Regan, 1908 (Eastern Cape and Natal)

Subclass Holocephali – Chimaeras

Order Chimaeriformes

Family: Callorhinchidae – Elephantfish
St Joseph shark or Elephant fish  Callorhinchus capensis Duméril, 1865 (Namibia to central KwaZulu-Natal)
Family: Chimaeridae – Chimaeras
Cape chimaera Chimaera sp. (Luderitz to Cape Point)
African chimaera Hydrolagus africanus (Gilchrist 1922) (Natal)
Hydrolagus sp. (off Durban)
Family: Rhinochimaeridae – Longnose chimaeras
Harriotta raleighana Goode and Bean, 1895 (off Western Cape)
Rhinochimaera africana Compagno, Stehman and Ebert, 1990 (west coast off Doring Bay and Cape Columbine, Natal coast off Kosi Bay)
Rhinochimaera atlantica Holt and Byrne, 1909 (Namibia to Plettenberg Bay)

Superclass Osteichthyes – Bony fishes 
See article List of marine bony fishes of South Africa

References

South Africa
Fishes
'
'